Mar Iskhaq Yosip is the Assyrian Church Bishop of Northern Iraq and Russia.

See also
Assyrian Church of the East
Assyrian Church of the East's Holy Synod

References

Iskhaq Yousip
Iraqi Assyrian people
Living people
Year of birth missing (living people)